Maraschino Cherry may refer to:

Maraschino cherry, a preserved, sweetened cherry
Maraschino Cherry (film), a 1978 American adult erotic film